Claudia Salinas (born 19 August 1983) is a Mexican model and actress; as a fashion blogger she is known as Miss Salinas, which is the name of her blog.

Career 
She studied at the Lee Strasberg Theatre Institute in New York.

Claudia has appeared in major television and print ad campaigns for brands like BudLight, Calvin Klein, Yoplait, All State. She has also appeared in magazines including GQ, Maxim, FHM, Bello and Trace.  She was featured as the cover girl for the June 2011 issue of FHM Indonesia.

Films with appearances by Claudia include "Dirty Dancing: Havana Nights", "Crossing Over" opposite Harrison Ford, and the acclaimed Mexican action comedy "Salvando al Soldado Perez".

Magazine appearances 

FHM 100 Sexiest Women of 2011 (#43)

Personal life 
Claudia was born in Monterrey, Nuevo Leon, Mexico.

Although she is fluent in English, her first language is Spanish. At the age of 4, she began training as a ballet dancer. She performed in several ballet productions in her hometown Monterrey. Her parents, skeptical of a career as a dancer, encouraged her to go to college. Following her parents footsteps, both academics, she graduated from Industrial and Systems Engineering from the Universidad Regiomontana when she was only 19.

References

External links

1983 births
Living people
Mexican emigrants to the United States
Mexican female models
Mexican film actresses
Mexican Jews
Mexican people of Russian-Jewish descent
People from Monterrey
Jewish female models
Universidad Regiomontana alumni